The Constitution of Croatia in its preamble defines Croatia as a nation state of ethnic Croats, a country of traditionally present communities that the constitution recognizes as national minorities and a country of all its citizens. National minorities explicitly enumerated and recognized in the Constitution are Serbs, Czechs, Slovaks, Italians, Hungarians, Jews, Germans, Austrians, Ukrainians, Rusyns, Bosniaks, Slovenes, Montenegrins, Macedonians, Russians, Bulgarians, Poles, Romani, Romanians, Istro-Romanians ("Vlachs"), Turks and Albanians. Article 12 of the constitution states that the official language in Croatia is Croatian, but also states that in some local governments another language and Cyrillic or some other script can be introduced in official use. Croatia recognises the following languages: Albanian, Bosnian, Bulgarian, Czech, German, Hebrew, Hungarian, Macedonian, Montenegrin, Polish, Romani, Romanian, Russian, Rusyn, Serbian, Slovak, Slovenian, Turkish and Ukrainian.

The official use of minority languages is defined by relevant national legislation and international conventions and agreements which Croatia signed. The most important national laws are Constitutional Act on the Rights of National Minorities, Law on Use of Languages and Scripts of National Minorities and Law on Education in Language and Script of National Minorities. Relevant international agreements are European Charter for Regional or Minority Languages and Framework Convention for the Protection of National Minorities. Certain rights were achieved through bilateral agreements and international agreements such as Treaty of Osimo and Erdut Agreement.

The required 33.3% of the minority population in certain local government units for obligatory introduction of official use of minority languages is considered high, taking into account that The Advisory Committee on the Framework Convention for the Protection of National Minorities of the Council of Europe considers a threshold from 10% to 20% reasonable. Croatia does not always show favorable views on issues of minority rights but Croatian European Union accession process positively influenced public usage of minority languages.

Official minority languages

Serbian 

Education in Serbian is primarily offered in the area of former Eastern Slavonia, Baranja and Western Syrmia based on Erdut Agreement. With those school since 2005 there is also Kantakuzina Katarina Branković Serbian Orthodox Secondary School in Zagreb.

Serb National Council publish weekly magazine Novosti since December 1999. There are also monthly magazines Identitet, published by Serb Democratic Forum, Izvor, published by Joint Council of Municipalities, youth magazine Bijela Pčela and culture magazine Prosvjeta, both published by Prosvjeta and Forum published by Serb National Council from Vukovar. There are also three local radio stations in Serbian in eastern Slavonia such as Radio Borovo. Since 1996 Central library of Prosvjeta works as the official Central Library of Serbs in Croatia as well. Prosvjeta's library was established on 4 January 1948 and at that time it had 40,000 volumes mostly in national literature including most of the books from XVIII and XIX century. In 1953 authorities made a decision to close the library and to deposit its books in Museum of Serbs of Croatia, National and University Library in Zagreb and Yugoslav Academy of Sciences and Arts. Library was reestablished in January 1995 and until 2016 it included more than 25,000 volumes in its collection.

Department of South Slavic languages at the Faculty of Humanities and Social Sciences at the University of Zagreb has a The Chair of Serbian and Montenegrin literature. Among the others, lecturers of Serbian literature at the university over the time were Antun Barac, Đuro Šurmin and Armin Pavić.

Controversies 
In the first years after introduction of new Constitutional Act on the Rights of National Minorities some local governments resisted implementation of its legal obligations. In 2005 Ombudsman report, municipalities of Vojnić, Krnjak, Gvozd, Donji Kukuruzari, Dvor and Korenica were mentioned as those that do not allow the official use of Serbian, although the national minority in these places meets the threshold provided for in the Constitutional Act. The report pointed out that Serbian minority in Vukovar can not use Serbian although minority constituted less than one percent less population than it was prescribed by law. After 2011 Croatian census Serbs of Vukovar meet the required proportion of population for co-official introduction of Serbian but it led to Anti-Cyrillic protests in Croatia. In April 2015 United Nations Human Rights Committee urged Croatia to ensure the right of minorities to use their language and alphabet. Committee report stated that particularly concerns the use of Serbian Cyrillic in the town of Vukovar and municipalities concerned. The Constitutional Court of Croatia upheld the legislation on the use of minority languages. It relied on a newly developed concept of national identity.

Italian 

Italian minority has realized much greater rights on bilingualism than other minority communities in Croatia. La Voce del Popolo is an Italian-language daily newspaper published by EDIT (EDizioni ITaliane) in the city of Rijeka. Central Library of Italians in Croatia operates as a section of Public library in Pula.

Hungarian 

In 2004, the Hungarian minority asked for introduction of Hungarian language in town of Beli Manastir as an official language, referring to the rights acquired prior to 1991. Hungarian minority at that time constituted 8,5% of town population. Central Library of Hungarians in Croatia operates as a section of Public library in Beli Manastir.

Czech 
6,287 declared Czechs live in Bjelovar-Bilogora County. 70% of them stated that their native language is Czech. Ambassador of Czech Republic in Croatia stated that intention to limit usage of Serbian Cyrillic would negatively affect Czechs and other minorities in Croatia. Central Library of Czechs in Croatia operates as a section of Public library in Daruvar. In an interview in 2011 Zdenka Čuhnil, MP for the Czech and Slovak minorities, stated that Czech minority, based on its acquired rights, have the legal right to use its language in 9 local units (municipalities or towns) while in practice usage of that right is enabled only in one unit and partially in one more. She also stated that in the case of Slovak minority out of 6 units (5 based on acquired rights and one on the basis of proportionality) is free to use its rights only in one.

Slovak 
In 2011 there was 11 elementary schools in which students from Slovak minority were able to learn Slovak. Those schools were located in Ilok, Osijek, Soljani, Josipovac Punitovački, Markovac Našički, Jelisavac, Miljevci, Zdenci, Lipovljani and Međurići. Gymnasium in Požega was the first high school in Croatia to introduce Slovak-language education into its elective curriculum. Union of Slovaks in cooperation with the Slovak Cultural Center in Našice publish the magazine Prameň in Slovak. On the 200th anniversary of birth of Štefan Moyses in 1997 Croatian branch of Matica slovenská set a bilingual memorial plate at the building of the Gornji Grad Gymnasium in Zagreb. In 2003 second bilingual plate commemorating the work of Martin Kukučín was set up in Lipik. Matica slovenská in Zagreb published more than 10 books in Slovak over the years. In 1998 Central Library of Slovaks in Croatia was established as a section of Public library in Našice and as of 2016 its users had access to more than 4,000 volumes.

Rusyn 
Central Library of Rusyns and Ukrainians in Croatia operates as a section of Public libraries in Zagreb. Library was established on 9 December 1995 and today part of its collection is accessible in public libraries in Vinkovci, Lipovljani, Slavonski Brod, Vukovar and Petrovci.

German 
Central Library of Austrians and Germans in Croatia operates as a section of Public library in Osijek.

Yiddish and Hebrew 

Organisation Zagreb Yiddish Circle is club that organizes courses in Yiddish, lectures on Jewish history, linguistics and culture, movie nights, and hosts a Yiddish book club.

Ukrainian 
Ukrainian-language classes are held in four schools in Lipovljani, Petrovci, Kaniža and Šumeće, attended by about 50 students. Central Library of Rusyns and Ukrainians in Croatia operates as a section of Public libraries in Zagreb. Library was established on 9 December 1995 and today part of its collection is accessible in public libraries in Vinkovci, Lipovljani, Slavonski Brod, Vukovar and Petrovci.

Romani 

Croatia previously made a reservation to Article 7.5 of ratification by European Charter for Regional or Minority Languages (ECRML), which excluded non-territorial languages such as Romani from the application of the Charter. In the first evaluation report of 2 December 2000, expert groups and the Secretariat of the ECRML have recommended that Romani and Bayash Romanian be recognized as distinct minority languages used by the Roma. Croatian authorities are in the process of withdrawing the reservation. Veljko Kajtazi, Romani community MP in Croatia, stated that he will advocate to have the Roma language included on the list of minority languages in Croatia during his term in office.

Croatian Parliament formally recognised Romani Language Day on May 25, 2012, which was on their initiative also proclaimed by UNESCO in 2015. At the Faculty of Philosophy, University of Zagreb, two courses in the Romani language on the Romani language, literature, culture and history have been taught since November 5, 2012. Central Library of Roma in Croatia was established on 8 June 2020 in Zagreb, and is presently the only such library in Europe.

Istro-Romanian 
Istro-Romanian is one of the smallest minority languages spoken in Croatia with fewer than 500 speakers concentrated mainly in the north-eastern part of the Istrian Peninsula. While the language is not officially recognized in the Constitution of Croatia under that name (the Constitution references Romanians and "Vlachs"), it is specifically recognized as such in the Statute of the Istrian Region and in the Statute of the Municipality of Kršan. In 2016, with funding from the Romanian government, the school in the village of Šušnjevica was fully renovated and is expected to start offering education in Istro-Romanian.

Other official languages 
There are three other central libraries in Croatia. Bosniak's community central library is located in the town of Sisak, Albanian one in Zagreb and Slovenian in Karlovac.

Municipalities with minority languages in official use 
List of towns and municipalities with minority languages in official use:

History 

During Napoleon I's invasion of Croatia in the early 19th century, a large portion was of the country was converted into the Illyrian Provinces (Provinces illyriennes) and incorporated as a French province in 1809. French rule established the official language of the autonomous province to be French followed by Croatian, Italian, German, and Slovene. According to France's Ministry for Europe and Foreign Affairs, about 6% of Croatians are fluent in basic conversation in French.

European Charter for Regional or Minority Languages became a legally binding for Croatia in 1997.

See also 
Minority language
Languages of Croatia
Official language
Demographics of Croatia
Linguistic rights
Language policy
Languages of the European Union

References 

Languages of Croatia
Croatia